Rhydyfelin Low Level Halt railway station was a small halt in the county borough of Rhondda Cynon Taf, South Wales. It opened in 1911 and closed in 1931.

History & Description
The halt was the terminus of the Cardiff Railway. Although the Rhydyfelin viaduct lay just beyond the station and connected the Cardiff Railway to the Taff Vale Railway lines at Treforest, the TVR was successful in preventing the instigation of regular trains over the viaduct.

The halt was very basic. At first, it consisted of a signal-cabin which had an adjoining fenced enclosure (at ground-level) where passengers waited. The gate was opened by the guard when the train arrived.

In 1924, the Great Western Railway amended the station's name to Rhydyfelin Low Level Halt to avoid confusion with the similarly named halt on the neighboring Pontypridd, Caerphilly and Newport line, which became Rhydyfelin High Level Halt at the same time.

In 1928, the GWR added a passing-loop and a proper platform. However, the halt closed in 1931 when the line was shut down.

Remains
The site of the halt is no longer easily traceable. Like many of the stations on the Cardiff Railway, it is now covered by the A470 trunk road.

Notes

Railway stations in Great Britain opened in 1911
Railway stations in Great Britain closed in 1931
Former Great Western Railway stations
Disused railway stations in Rhondda Cynon Taf
Former Cardiff Railway stations